Černá v Pošumaví (until 1950 Černá) is a municipality and village in Český Krumlov District in the South Bohemian Region of the Czech Republic. It has about 800 inhabitants. It is a popular summer resort.

Administrative parts
Villages of Bližná, Dolní Vltavice, Mokrá, Muckov and Plánička are administrative parts of Černá v Pošumaví.

Etymology
The Czech name Černá (i.e. "black") and the historical German name Schwarzbach (i.e. "black stream") were derived from the stream that flowed below the village. The oldest forms of the name was Natschernerece (literally "on the black river") and Nachirnie. In 1483, the name Czerna first appeared. From 1530, the name Schwarzbach was used in various forms.

Geography
The municipal territory borders Germany. It lies in the Bohemian Forest on the shore of the Lipno Reservoir.

History
The first written mention of Černá v Pošumaví is in the donation deed of Ottokar II of Bohemia from 1268, who gave the village to his burgrave Hirzo of Klingenberg.

After 1945, some formerly independent municipalities in the territory of today's Černá v Pošumaví were liquidated due to the expulsion of the German population and the modification of the border zone, partly due to the construction of the Lipno Reservoir.

Graphite mining
The first records of the mining of graphite date from the 1760s. Graphite mines were opened by the Schwarzenbergs in 1812. Ink was used for the production of pencils in the Zlatá Koruna and in České Budějovice at the Kooh-i-noor Hardtmuth company. Most of the graphite deposits were flooded by a dam.

Demographics

References

External links

Villages in Český Krumlov District
Bohemian Forest